Rohit Vyas is an independent broadcast journalist and the longest-serving Indian American journalist in ethnic print and broadcast media covering the South Asian community throughout North America.

Journalism career
A member of the United Nations Correspondents Association for over 40 years, he is currently an independent broadcaster, media consultant and political commentator, focusing on international affairs.

In April 1993, Vyas was appointed news director and principal news anchor by Indian actor Amitabh Bachchan for the new television channel, TV ASIA. He continued in that role with the added title of senior vice president through October 2019 while helming the English nightly news and two long form interview shows titled Between the Lines with Rohit Vyas and Face to Face.

Prior to that, Vyas was the principal news anchor and news director of Vision of Asia from 1987 to 1993. From 1977 to 1979, Vyas was the Editor of News India, a New York-based ethnic newspaper with a national circulation in the United States. In 1979 he became the editor of the oldest Indian American newspaper in the United States, India Abroad. He was with the organization until 1982. In 1982, Rohit Vyas established, and became the Editor of, International Observer, a foreign affairs publication, which focused on international diplomacy around the globe and the United Nations.

Career

In 2000, Vyas was a part of the White House media delegation during  President Bill Clinton’s visit to South Asia, the Middle East, and Switzerland. Prior to that, in 1994, at the invitation of  Prime Minister P.V. Narasimha Rao, Vyas became the first American journalist to be an official member of an Indian Prime Minister’s media delegation on his visit to the United States.

Throughout his career, Vyas has done a number of high-profile interviews with world leaders, politicians and celebrities. As the longest-serving Indian-American journalist in North America, Vyas has said that he has had to evolve the news over three generations of South Asian-Americans.

Public Service
Rohit Vyas has a storied history in public service. From 1993 to 1995, he was on an informal Asian American advisory group for the New York Times.

From 1994 to 2001, Vyas served on the Asian American Pacific Advisory Council for New Jersey Governor Christine Whitman. His affiliation with New Jersey politics continued and in 2001, he moderated the first New Jersey Gubernatorial debate for the Asian American community between Democrat Jim McGreevey and Republican Bret Schundler. In a 2017 interview with Vyas, then New Jersey gubernatorial candidate Phil Murphy committed to name an Indian-American or South Asian-American as attorney general. In January 2018, Gurinder Grewal was sworn in as the first Sikh-American and second South Asian (after Kamala Harris in California in 2011) attorney general of a U.S. state.

Vyas was the emcee for the Indian American community’s gala reception in New York City in honor of then presidential candidate Hillary Clinton.

From 1989 and for 21 years thereafter, Rohit Vyas was the Master of Ceremonies for the annual India Day Parade in New York City, the biggest event outside of India commemorating Indian Independence.

He was also the Master of Ceremonies for major programs organized by leading associations of the Indian American community, including the annual convention of the American Association of Physicians of Indian Origin (AAPI), the annual Deepavali Festival hosted by the Association of Indians in America, the annual galas of Share and Care Foundation, the Nargis Dutt Foundation and the Wheels Global Foundation among many others.

Awards
Rohit Vyas has been honored by several government and non-government entities, including the New Jersey State Assembly, New York City, Nassau County, NY, the National Federation of Indian Associations and the Federation of Indian Associations (NY Tri-State), among others.

Personal life
Vyas resides in New Jersey with his wife. The couple has two daughters, Radhika Vyas and Aditi Vyas.

See also
 Indian Americans
 Gujarati Americans
 Indians in the New York City metropolitan region
 New Yorkers in journalism

References 

American University alumni
Living people
American television journalists
American male journalists
Year of birth missing (living people)